This is a list of tennis players who have represented the Spain Davis Cup team in an official Davis Cup match since Spain took part in the competition for the first time, back in 1921.

Players
This table is current through the end of the 2022 Davis Cup Finals (November 23, 2022).

Notes

References

Spain
 
Tennis